Lactobacillus kefiranofaciens is a species of slime-forming, homofermentative, rod-shaped lactic acid bacteria first isolated from kefir grains, hence its name. Its type strain is WT-2B (ATCC 43761). Its genome has been sequenced.

References

Further reading

External links

LPSN
Type strain of Lactobacillus kefiranofaciens at BacDive -  the Bacterial Diversity Metadatabase

Lactobacillaceae
Bacteria described in 1988